Kinmonth  is a surname. Notable people with the surname include: 

 Ack Kinmonth, Australian film and television composer
 Margy Kinmonth, British film and television director
 Patrick Kinmonth (born 1957), Anglo-Irish opera director and artist

See also
 Kinmonth House', a listed building, in Scotland